George William McClelland (1880−1955) was an American educator, provost of the University of Pennsylvania from 1939 to 1944, and president of the University of Pennsylvania from 1944 to 1948.

McClelland received his bachelors, masters and Ph.D. all from the University of Pennsylvania in 1903, 1912 and 1916 respectively.  He began his teaching career as an English instructor at City College of New York in 1903.  In 1911 McClelland became an instructor in English at Penn and then in 1917 he became an assistant professor of English at the University of Pennsylvania.  In 1924 he was made a full professor of English, a position he held until he was given emeritus status in 1950.

At the same time as he held his academic positions McClelland also held administrative positions.  He worked as assistant director of undergraduate admissions from 1915−1921.  From 1921 to 1925 he was Penn's director of undergraduate admissions.  He then served as vice provost from 1925−1928.  From 1928 until 1931 he was vice provost in charge of undergraduate schools.  He then became vice president in charge of undergraduate schools, a position he held until his appointment as provost in 1939.  After he stepped down as president in 1948 McClelland served as a trustee of Penn until his death in 1955.

References

Sources
UPenn bio

1880 births
1955 deaths
City College of New York faculty
University of Pennsylvania faculty
Chief Administrators of the University of Pennsylvania
20th-century American academics